Ten Sleep Mercantile, also known as Ten Sleep Hardware, is an example of a typical small-town general store.  Located in Ten Sleep, Wyoming, it has been the focal point of the town since it was built in 1905 by H.T. Church.  Upon Church's death in 1918 the property was bought by Buffalo businessman and rancher Alex Healy (Rancher) in an agreement that brought the store under the control of Paul Frison. Frison, who later served as mayor of Ten Sleep and as a Wyoming state legislator, operated the store from 1918 to 1943.

Ten Sleep Mercantile is an example of the tall, narrow and deep commercial buildings commonly found in small American towns. The two story balloon frame building is the best preserved building of its kind in Ten Sleep. The building is clad in wood clapboards. The front facade features a rod-supported shed roofed porch sheltering display windows and a recessed double door. The second floor has three double-hung windows, while the top of the facade is capped with a simplified bracketed cornice. The side elevations feature a stepped parapet following the single-pitched main roof as it rises from the rear to the front. On the east side a covered stairway climbs to the second floor.

The interior is well preserved with a large, deep main room and a pressed tin ceiling and plastered walls. A row of arched columns support the second floor. The second floor originally comprised two large rooms for the live-in owners, now subdivided. An unfinished basement underlies all.

Paul Frison was significant as a local historian who was instrumental in promoting the Black and Yellow Trail, a tourist route on US 14 from Chicago to Yellowstone National Park running through Ten Sleep.  The trail's name was derived from the fact that it linked the Black Hills and Yellowstone. Established in 1912, the route featured Ten Sleep Canyon, just to the east of the town.

References

External links
 at the National Park Service's NRHP database
Ten Sleep Hardware at the Wyoming State Historic Preservation Office

Commercial buildings on the National Register of Historic Places in Wyoming
Buildings and structures in Washakie County, Wyoming
Commercial buildings completed in 1905
U.S. Route 16
National Register of Historic Places in Washakie County, Wyoming
1905 establishments in Wyoming